Allan Reese (born 26 July 1967) is a retired Danish football striker.

References

1967 births
Living people
Danish men's footballers
Aarhus Gymnastikforening players
Viborg FF players
Silkeborg IF players
Danish Superliga players
Association football forwards
Denmark under-21 international footballers
Boldklubben 1913 players